The 2nd IAAF World Cup in Athletics was an international track and field sporting event sponsored by the International Association of Athletics Federations, held on August 24–26, 1979, at Olympic Stadium in Montreal, Quebec, Canada.

Overall results

Medal summary

Men

Women

1 Totka Petrova of Europe originally won the 1500m with 4:06.47, but she was disqualified after it was found that she had failed a doping test at the Balkan Games.

External links
World Cup Results
Full Results by IAAF

IAAF Continental Cup
World Cup
IAAF World Cup
World Cup